Orlik (Orlig; , Örlög) is a rural locality (a selo) and the administrative center of Okinsky District of the Republic of Buryatia, Russia. Population:

Climate

References

Notes

Sources

Rural localities in Okinsky District